The 1995 Atlantic 10 Conference Baseball Championship was held at Bear Stadium in Boyertown, Pennsylvania from May 12 through 14. The double elimination tournament featured the top four regular-season finishers. Top-seeded Massachusetts defeated Rutgers in the title game to win the tournament for the second time, earning the Atlantic 10's automatic bid to the 1995 NCAA Tournament.

Seeding and format 
The league's top four teams, based on winning percentage in the 24-game regular-season schedule, were seeded one through four.

Bracket

All-Tournament 
Massachusetts's Nelson Ubaldo was named Most Outstanding Player, while St. Bonaventure's Andy Steinorth was named Most Outstanding Pitcher.

References 

Atlantic 10 Conference tournament
Atlantic 10 Conference Baseball Tournament
Atlantic 10 Conference baseball tournament
Atlantic 10 Conference baseball tournament
Baseball in Pennsylvania
College sports in Pennsylvania
History of Berks County, Pennsylvania
Sports competitions in Pennsylvania
Sports in the Delaware Valley
Tourist attractions in Berks County, Pennsylvania